Bauhinia is a rural town in the Central Highlands Region and a rural locality split between the Central Highlands Region and the Aboriginal Shire of Woorabinda, both in Queensland, Australia.

Geography
The town is located near the junction of the Dawson Highway and the Fitzroy Developmental Road. The bulk of the locality is within Central Highlands Region, but the south-east of the locality is part of the Aboriginal Shire of Woorabinda.

The land use is crop growing around the Zamia Creek in the east and south-east of the locality. Apart from that, the predominant land use is grazing on native vegetation.

History
Bauhinia State School opened on 20 March 1967. In 2017, the school celebrated its 50th anniversary.

Education
Bauhinia State School is a government primary (Prep-6) school for boys and girls at 11559 Fitzroy Development Road. In 2013, the school had 15 students and 2 teachers (1 full-time equivalent). In 2018, the school had an enrolment of 22 students with 3 teachers (2 full-time equivalent) and 6 non-teaching staff (2 full-time equivalent).

There are no secondary schools in Bauhinia; the nearest government secondary school is Moura State High School in Moura to the east, but it is sufficiently distant than alternatives would be distance education and boarding school.

Facilities 
The Central Highlands Regional Council operates a library at Eulan Downs, Moura,  which is available by appointment only.  The library does not offer internet access.

References

External links 

 

Central Highlands Region
Towns in Queensland
Aboriginal Shire of Woorabinda
Localities in Queensland